Jubbega is a village in the north of the Netherlands, located in the municipality of Heerenveen, Friesland. In 2021, it had a population of 3,255, mai

History

15th–18th century 
The village was first mentioned in 1408 as Jobbegae, and means village of Jobbe (person). The village merged with neighbouring Schurega, together known as Jubbega-Schurega. 

The Dutch Reformed Church in Jubbega was completed in 1715. The tower was completed in 1910. In 1774, a new sluice was constructed for the peat excavation and a little settlement developed around the sluice.

19th–21st century 
In 1840, Jubbega-Schurega was home to 203 people. 

In  1934, the municipality of Schoterland was split up. Jubbega was annexed to Heerenveen. In the 1950s–1970s, the population of Jubbega hovered around 3000. In 1974, the name of the village was shortened to Jubbega. 

Since the late 1990s, the number of inhabitants varies around 3300.

Gallery

References

Populated places in Friesland
Heerenveen